Potter Valley is a census-designated place in Mendocino County, California, United States. The CDP population was 665 at the 2020 census.

History
In 1852, when William and Thomas Potter and Mose Briggs first entered what would become known as Potter Valley, they were searching for the headwaters of the Russian River from their base in Sonoma County. The Pomo people called it Ba-lo Kai. They found three Pomo villages (each about 500 people strong), the Russian headwaters, and a lush valley with wild oats "stirrup high". Eventually the Potters returned to settle there, and the valley became known by the American ranchers' name.

The post office opened in 1870.

Painter Grace Hudson was born in Potter Valley in 1865.

In addition to his famous Ridgewood Ranch, Charles S. Howard, owner of the racehorse Seabiscuit, owned a ranch in Potter Valley where he ran cattle.

Geography
The headwaters of the East Fork of the Russian River originate in the valley. The Potter Valley Project delivers additional water from the Eel River, which flows into the Russian River here via a controversial hydroelectric plant that tunnels through the mountains to take advantage of the relative proximity of these two waterways. This diversion supplies a significant amount of water to inland Mendocino and Sonoma counties. Potter Valley is a rich agricultural region, with excellent soils, planted mostly in irrigated pasture, wine grapes, and pears, but supporting a wide variety of farms and ranches.

Climate
Potter Valley has a hot-summer Mediterranean climate (Csa) typical of the interior of Northern California, with hot, dry summers and cool, wet winters, along with great diurnal temperature variation.

Demographics
The 2010 United States Census reported that the Potter Valley CDP had a population of 646. The racial makeup of Potter Valley was 516 (79.9%) White, 2 (0.3%) African American, 13 (2.0%) Native American, 2 (0.3%) Asian, 0 (0.0%) Pacific Islander, 97 (15.0%) from other races, and 16 (2.5%) from two or more races. Hispanic or Latino of any race were 154 persons (23.8%).

The Census reported that 636 people (98.5% of the population) lived in households, 10 (1.5%) lived in non-institutionalized group quarters, and 0 (0%) were institutionalized.

There were 241 households, out of which 73 (30.3%) had children under the age of 18 living in them, 125 (51.9%) were opposite-sex married couples living together, 20 (8.3%) had a female householder with no husband present, 16 (6.6%) had a male householder with no wife present.  There were 20 (8.3%) unmarried opposite-sex partnerships, and 0 (0%) same-sex married couples or partnerships. 61 households (25.3%) were made up of individuals, and 22 (9.1%) had someone living alone who was 65 years of age or older. The average household size was 2.64.  There were 161 families (66.8% of all households); the average family size was 3.19.

The population was spread out, with 142 people (22.0%) under the age of 18, 56 people (8.7%) aged 18 to 24, 156 people (24.1%) aged 25 to 44, 206 people (31.9%) aged 45 to 64, and 86 people (13.3%) who were 65 years of age or older.  The median age was 41.6 years. For every 100 females, there were 105.1 males.  For every 100 females age 18 and over, there were 101.6 males.

The homeowner vacancy rate was 0%; the rental vacancy rate was 10.0%.  382 people (59.1% of the population) lived in owner-occupied housing units and 254 people (39.3%) lived in rental housing units.

Politics

References

External links
 Potter Valley Bird Sightings
 Potter Valley American Viticultural Area
 Potter Valley Websites
 Potter Valley Community Unified School District
 Historical weather data from the Potter Valley Pumping Station
 Potter Valley Community Parks & Recreation
 Potter Valley Youth & Community Center
 Potter Valley Irrigation District
 Potter Valley Tribe of Pomo Indians

Census-designated places in Mendocino County, California
Populated places established in 1852
Census-designated places in California
1852 establishments in California